Sai Wan Ho is a primarily residential area on the northeastern shore of Hong Kong Island, Hong Kong, between Quarry Bay and Shau Kei Wan. It is part of the Eastern District, and is administered together with surrounding areas under the Eastern District Council.

History
At the time of the 1911 census, the population of Sai Wan Ho was 876. The number of males was 650.

Location
Sai Wan Ho is conventionally agreed to extend between the Taikoo Shing Road, Shau Kei Wan Road and King's Road junction to the west, and the Shau Kei Wan tram depot in the east. It is bounded by the Victoria Harbour to the north, and mountains to the south.

Housing

Sai Wan Ho is primarily residential. The hill was once filled with squatter settlements, which were later demolished and replaced with new residential buildings. Taikoo Shing, redeveloped from Taikoo Dockyard, spans the east end of the area. From the 1980s through the 2000s, extensive reclamation drastically reshaped the shore. Private housing estates were built near the new sea front, like Lei King Wan, Les Saisons and Grand Promenade. However, older buildings such as Tai On Building still remain further inland.

Amenities and attractions 

Sai Wan Ho Civic Centre, A community arts centre
Hong Kong Film Archive
Island East Sports Centre
Sai Wan Ho Sports Centre
Eastern Law Courts Building
Sai Wan Ho Health Centre
Aldrich Bay Park
Sai Wan Ho Market, With Market and Cooked Food Centre 
Hong Kong Police Force Report Rooms, Traffic Hong Kong Island
Sai Wan Ho Fire Station

Transport

Sai Wan Ho station, served by the Island line
Numerous buses and minibuses serve the area
Coral Sea Shipping Services provide regular ferry services from Sai Wan Ho Ferry Pier to Kwun Tong and Sam Ka Tsuen
Blue Sea Ferry provides regular ferry services from Sai Wan Ho to Tung Lung Island (formerly served by Lam Kee Ferry)
Sai Wan Ho Tram Depot, is the northern depot of the Hong Kong Tramways, which is between North Point and Shau Kei Wan
Island Eastern Corridor

Education
Hong Kong Chinese Women's Club College, Government aided co-educational grammar school
Munsang College (Hong Kong Island), Government aided co-educational grammar school
Korean International School of Hong Kong, International school

Sai Wan Ho is in Primary One Admission (POA) School Net 16. Within the school net are multiple aided schools (operated independently but funded with government money) and two government schools: Shau Kei Wan Government Primary School and Aldrich Bay Government Primary School.

References

 
Eastern District, Hong Kong